Pagliarone   is a frazione  in the Province of Chieti in the Abruzzo region of Italy.  

Frazioni of the Province of Chieti